The 1976 Air Force Falcons football team represented the United States Air Force Academy as an independent during the 1976 NCAA Division I football season. Led by 19th-year head coach Ben Martin, the Falcons compiled a record of 4–7 and were outscored by their opponents 273–180. Air Force played their home games at Falcon Stadium in Colorado Springs, Colorado.

Schedule

References

Air Force
Air Force Falcons football seasons
Air Force Falcons football